David Lutalo (born 8 March 1986), is a Ugandan musician, artist and performer from East Africa, who rose to fame ten years back with his hit Kapapaala in 2008, released under his own Record Label "Da Hares". He started recording music in 2008 and has several solo songs to his name as well as several collaborations with Eddy Kenzo, Bebe Cool, and Goodlyfe Crew, Solid Star.

Lutalo is known by Uganda's music audiences for his distinct, high-toned, sharp voice which has made him a favorite among rural and urban Ugandans. He has been rated in some circles as the unofficial Ugandan musician of the year in 2014. In 2013, Lutalo joined hands with Mowzey Radio and Weasle of Goodlyfe Crew and they produced Hellena song. In 2014, he collaborated with a young musician Maro, Mubbi bubi. David Lutalo release song "Kabisi Ka Ndagala" video.  In January 2016, he won the Best Male Artist and the Artist of the Year awards at the HiPipo Music Awards ceremony.

Early life and education background
David Lutalo, was born to  Luggya Robinson (father) and Mastula Nassazi (mother) in Luweero district and is well known for his ability to sing fluently in Luganda language, Swahili language, and some bit English Language. He attended quite a number of schools like  Kikunyu Primary school, Balitta Lwogi Primary School where he attained his Primary Leaving Examination (PLE), then he joined Kasana Town Academy Luwero for his high school studies, where he attained his Uganda Certificate of Education (UCE), and after David went to Busisa Grammar for his A-Level education which ended halfway and he left school without completing his A-level.

Discography 
 Kapaapala
 Gyetugenda
 Yamba
 Magumba
 Manya
 I love you
 Pretty
 So Nice
 Kwasa
 Eat zote
 Mile
 Akantu
 Nakusiima
 Onsanula
 Tugende
 Ensi
Silivia
Awo
Tokutula
Am in Love
Kabisi Ka Ndagala
Mboona
Yankutudde
Engrid
Yokoto
Holy
Nalongo

See also
List of Ugandan musicians

References

1986 births
Living people
21st-century Ugandan male singers
People from Luweero District